Jan Kraeck (1540, Haarlem – 1607, Turin), was a Dutch Renaissance painter who established his career in Italy, in the royal court of the House of Savoy in Turin.

Biography
According to Karel van Mander he was visited by Hendrik Cornelisz Vroom in 1585 in Turin.

According to the RKD he was the father-in-law of the painter-architect Friedrich Sustris and became court painter to Emanuel Philibert, duc de Savoie and after the duke died in 1580, to the duke's successor Charles Emanuel I.

Works
The Holy Family (1568-1578), Sabauda Gallery
Three armoured men in prayer in front of the Holy Virgin and Child (1568-1585), Sabauda Gallery
Portrait of Charles Emmanuel I of Savoy (1580), Fundacion Yannick y Ben Jakober
Portrait of Philip Emmanuel of Savoy, five years old (1591), Museo del Prado
Victor Amadeus I, Emmanuel Philibert and Philip Emmanuel of Savoy (1593-1594), Fundacion Yannick y Ben Jakober
Portrait of Philip Emmanuel of Savoy (c. 1603, attributed), Fundacion Yannick y Ben Jakober

References

Bibliography
Astrua Paola, Bava Anna Maria, Spantigati Carla Enrica, Il nostro pittore fiamengo (Our Flemish Painters), Giovanni Carraca alla corte dei Savoia (1568–1607), Turin, Umberto Allemandi & C, 1955, 2002 and 2006 editions.

External links

Biography at the Museo del Prado Online Encyclopedia 
Jan Kraeck on Artnet

1540 births
1607 deaths
Dutch Renaissance painters
Artists from Haarlem
Court painters
Dutch expatriates in Italy